"Pensativa" is a bossa nova jazz standard by American pianist/composer/arranger Clare Fischer, first recorded in 1962 by a quintet under the joint leadership of Fischer and saxophonist Bud Shank, and released that year as part of an album entitled Bossa Nova Jazz Samba, comprising music in this style, as per its title, all of it arranged by Fischer, and, with the exception of Erroll Garner's "Misty", composed by him as well. In retrospect, this would prove to be just the first of countless forays by Fischer into various areas of Latin music (with "area" denoting both genre and geographic region). This particular song was one of the first, and almost certainly the most famous, of all the foreign-born - i.e. non-Brazilian - bossa novas. Its form, though extended (64 mm.), is standard A-A-B-A, with each section consisting of 16 measures instead of eight.

Alternate versions
With the exception of his contrastingly Cuban-styled composition, "Morning", "Pensativa" is by far Fischer's most frequently recorded work; it has been performed by a wide variety of instrumental groupings, ranging from assorted unaccompanied instruments - including piano, guitar and flute - to string orchestras, big bands, and a large assortment of ensemble sizes in between.

In addition to numerous recordings by the composer himself (including at least five released under his own name, plus many more featuring the composer as either co-leader, sideman, or arranger, all of them employing Fischer's arrangements), it has been covered by a multitude of artists, including Bill Evans, Dave Valentin, Gene Harris, Jack Wilson, Bill Perkins, Brian Bromberg, Bob Florence, and Rob McConnell. Many more, including George Shearing, Gene Bertoncini, Hubert Laws, Billy Taylor, Bill Mays, Marian McPartland, Benny Green, Sam Most, Gary Foster, and Freddie Hubbard, have made "Pensativa" part of their regular repertoires.

In fact, of all the recordings made of this song (including those by the composer), by far the best known is the one arranged by Hubbard and recorded in 1964 by Art Blakey & the Jazz Messengers, released in 1964 on the album Free for All. While not surprising, given the All-Star calibre of its participants (the iconic Blakey himself, and his no less iconic Jazz Messengers, in this instance including three premiere soloists - pianist Cedar Walton and Hubbard on trumpet, plus the influential saxophonist and composer Wayne Shorter), this state of affairs would prove extremely frustrating to the composer. Speaking to students at an informal clinic hosted by his brother Dirk in October 1998, Fischer explained:
That has been recorded by some jazz players - Freddie Hubbard is one of them. They don't understand two-beat samba, so they play it like a 4... [demonstrating], then they change the melody, then they change the chords, which are going into what we call bebop II-V. Mine go [plays mm. 9 through 13]. He recorded that with Art Blakey. Very famous. 85 percent of the people who know that song know it from that recording. Everyone who records it now plays it with the same cancer that I've had all my life with that song. I've been unable to disestablish that because I don't sell as many records as Freddie Hubbard. It gets to a point where you say, "Hey! It's my song. Yeah." Well, it doesn't make any difference.

Lyrics
Fischer's belatedly added lyrics for "Pensativa" were unveiled in 1984 by vocalist Sandi Shoemake accompanied by the composer on Shoemake's album Slowly, recorded in 1982. They were promptly reprised in 1985, again with Fischer accompanying, this time with a full rhythm section, on singer Lisa Rich's second album, Touch of the Rare. Subsequent vocal recordings have been made by Kaz Simmons (2004), and Iain Mackenzie (2007), the latter singing his own lyrics. Jazz singer Jan Wentz performed "Pensativa" with her own lyrics but never recorded them.

As with each new dawnSun is giving the breath of day,And warms the cold from nightAnd hovers softly o'er the sea of day.

And now with the twilightYou sit pensive and lost it seemsWhat lived so near last nightIs now converted into empty dreams.

For day starts once more anewAnd lifts you from the clutching bonds of nightAnd leads you once more in search of happinessEver seeking on and on, searching endlessly for what is gone.

Then night drops its curtainMaking certain your lonelinessAnd fills a longing cloud [also: "and drops a shroud of gloom" - better!]That leaves you in your lonely pensiveness.

Selected recordings
Bud Shank & Clare Fischer - Bossa Nova Jazz Samba, 1962
George Shearing - Shearing Bossa Nova, 1963, woodwinds arranged by Fischer.
Bill Perkins - Bossa Nova with Strings Attached, 1963, arranged by Bob Florence.
Clare Fischer - So Danço Samba, 1964
Art Blakey & the Jazz Messengers - Free For All, 1964, arranged by Freddie Hubbard.
Freddie Hubbard - The Night of the Cookers, recorded live at Club La Marchal, April 1965.
Gary Foster - Subconsciously, 1968, with Fischer, piano.
Cedar Walton - Soul Cycle, 1969
Clare Fischer - Reclamation Act of 1972, 1970
Hubert Laws - Wild Flower, 1972, with string orchestra, arranged by John Murtaugh.
John Hicks - Steadfast, recorded 1975, released 1980
George Shearing - The Many Facets of George Shearing, 1977, duet with bassist Andy Simpkins.
Bill Evans - Crosscurrents, recorded in 1977, released in 1978; also features saxophonists Warne Marsh and Lee Konitz.
Charles Lloyd - Autumn in New York, 1979, strings arranged and conducted by Fischer.
Poncho Sanchez - Straight Ahead, 1980, with Fischer, piano, arranger & conductor.
Sandi Shoemake - Slowly, recorded 1982, released 1984; features Fischer on piano, accompanying Shoemake, who debuts the composer's belatedly added lyrics.
Ed Bickert - Bye Bye Baby, 1983
Lisa Rich (featuring the Clare Fischer Quartet) - Touch of the Rare, 1985, again featuring Fischer's lyrics, with the composer on piano and his son Brent on bass.
Gene Bertoncini, Michael Moore, Edison Machado - O Grande Amor: A Bossa Nova Collection, 1986
James L. Dean - Ceora, 1990, featuring Claudio Roditi
Dave Valentin - Red Sun, 1992
George Shearing - Walkin' , 1992
Gene Harris - A Little Piece Of Heaven, 1993
Terry Trotter - It's About Time, 1993, arranged by Fischer, who also follows Trotter's solo with his own uncredited half-chorus on electric piano.
Eastman Jazz Ensemble - Live performance at the Eastman Theatre, recorded November 12, 1993, never released; arranged by Dirk Fischer (the composer's brother), conducted by Bill Dobbins, featuring Gary Foster.
Clare Fischer - Just Me: Solo Piano Excursions, 1995
Bill Harris - Solo + One, 1997
Rob McConnell & the Boss Brass - Play the Jazz Classics, 1997
Clare Fischer - The Latin Side, 1998, with the Metropole Orchestra, arranged by Fischer, who also plays piano, accompanying clarinetist Don Shelton.
Michael Moore - The History of Jazz, Volume 1, 2000, with Ken Peplowski and Tom Melito
Toledo Jazz Orchestra - Out of Nowhere, 2000
Manhattan School of Music Jazz Philharmonic Orchestra - Concert of May 17, 2002, recorded live, not released; arranged by and featuring Michael Abene.
Clare Fischer & Helio Delmiro - Symbiosis, 2003
Henry Franklin - Three Card Molly, 2004
Bob Florence - Friends, Treasures, Heroes, 2005
Sherrie Maricle & The Diva Jazz Orchestra - TNT: A Tommy Newsom Tribute, 2005, arranged by Tommy Newsom.
Brian Bromberg - Wood II, 2006
Jim Self - InnerPlay, 2005, strings arranged by Brad Dechter, featuring Self on tuba and long-time Fischer colleague Gary Foster on flute.
Doug Beavers 9 - Two Shades of Nude, 2010, featuring trumpeter Alex Sipiagin.
Quinn Johnson - Tunes, Bits and Other Pieces, 2011
Bill Harris Quintet - Inside Out, 2012
Roseanna Vitro - Clarity: Music of Clare Fischer, 2014

Notes

References

External links
Fischer's own lead sheet, w/ piano voicings at Jazz Piano Workshop
 (Starting at 2:36, Fischer plays Pensativa, then discusses Freddie Hubbard's arrangement.)
Liner notes for Bossa Nova Jazz Samba at CDandLP.com.

1960s jazz standards
1962 songs
Bossa nova songs